Nikolay Ivanovich Kirov (born 22 November 1957 in Streshin, Homel, Soviet Union) was a Soviet athlete who mainly competed in the men's 800 metres.

He competed for Soviet Union at the 1980 Summer Olympics held in Moscow, Soviet Union where he won the bronze medal in the men's 800 metres event behind British duo Sebastian Coe and Steve Ovett. Kirov claimed the silver medal in the 1500 meters at the 1982 European Championships.

References 
 sports-reference

1957 births
Belarusian male middle-distance runners
Soviet male middle-distance runners
Olympic bronze medalists for the Soviet Union
Athletes (track and field) at the 1980 Summer Olympics
Olympic athletes of the Soviet Union
Living people
European Athletics Championships medalists
People from Zhlobin District
Medalists at the 1980 Summer Olympics
Olympic bronze medalists in athletics (track and field)
Sportspeople from Gomel Region